The Dr Maurice Curé State College is the one of the top-ranked national secondary schools in Mauritius, located in Vacoas. It is known for its annual high-rate achievement in the 0-level and A-level Cambridge examinations certificate. It is recognised as one of the best secondary schools due to these exceptional annual results. Many students of the institution have been classed at national and international level in various different subjects.

The college is named after Maurice Curé.

References

Internal links 
 List of secondary schools in Mauritius

External links 
 Dr. Maurice Curé State College

Secondary schools in Mauritius
Girls' schools in Mauritius
Vacoas-Phoenix
Educational institutions with year of establishment missing